Class 54 may refer to:

 A German goods train locomotive class with a 2-6-0 wheel arrangement operated by the Deutsche Reichsbahn which comprised the:
 Class 54.0: Prussian G 5.1
 Class 54.0II: BBÖ 60, PKP Class Ti12, PKP Class Ti16, JDŽ 131
 Class 54.1: BBÖ 260, PKP Class Ti11, ČSD Class 333.1
 Class 54.2-3: Prussian G 5.2
 Class 54.2-3II: BBÖ 360
 Class 54.4: BBÖ 460
 Class 54.5: ČSD Class 344.3
 Class 54.6: Prussian G 5.3 
 Class 54.6II: PKP Class Ti1, PKP Class Ti3, JDŽ 128
 Class 54.7: PKP Class Ti2
 Class 54.8-12: Prussian G 5.4 
 Class 54.10: Prussian G 5.5
 Class 54.12: Mecklenburg G 5.4
 Class 54.13: Bavarian C VI
 Class 54.14: Bavarian G 3/4 N
 Class 54.15-17: Bavarian G 3/4 H